Frisilia forficatella is a moth in the family Lecithoceridae. It was described by Kyu-Tek Park in 2005. It is found in Thailand.

The wingspan is 15–15.5 mm. The species is superficially similar to Frisilia asiana, but the forewing is slightly broader with a strongly oblique termen and a larger discal dot.

References

Moths described in 2005
Frisilia